Walter Lee Coleman (June 13, 1873 – November 20, 1925) was an American left-handed pitcher in Major League Baseball who played briefly for the St. Louis Browns during the 1895 season.

A native of Lee's Summit, Missouri, Coleman entered the majors on September 25, 1895. In a complete game appearance, he was charged with 15 runs (including 12 earned) on 12 hits with eight walks and five strikeouts in 8.0 innings. He took the loss and never appeared in another major league game.

Coleman died at the age of 52 in Bunceton, Missouri.

External links
Baseball Reference
Retrosheet

1873 births
1925 deaths
19th-century baseball players
Major League Baseball pitchers
St. Louis Cardinals players
Anaconda Serpents players
Helena Senators players
Tacoma Tigers players
Baseball players from Missouri
People from Lee's Summit, Missouri